Dmitry Semyonovich Fesenko (September 1895 – 15 October 1937) was a Soviet Komkor (corps commander). He was born in present-day Stavropol Krai. He fought for the Imperial Russian Army during World War I before going over to the Bolsheviks during the subsequent Civil War. He was a recipient of the Order of the Red Banner. During the Great Purge, he was arrested on 18 July 1937 and later executed at Kommunarka.

References 
 

1895 births
1937 deaths
Soviet komkors
Russian military personnel of World War I
Soviet military personnel of the Russian Civil War
Recipients of the Order of the Red Banner
Great Purge victims from Russia
People executed by the Soviet Union